Kannagi: Crazy Shrine Maidens is a Japanese manga series written and illustrated by Eri Takenashi. It has been serialized in the Ichijinsha's Comic Rex since December 9, 2005. The plot follows the adventures of Jin Mikuriya, who releases Nagi, a guardian deity, from a statue, and Nagi and Jin's attempts to "purify" the world.

Ichijinsha is collecting the series in tankōbon. The first volume was released on August 9, 2006, and as of August 2, 2014, ten volumes have been released. Each volume comes bundled with a pin-up drawn in a collaboration between Takenashi and other prominent artists. The series was adapted into an anime by A-1 Pictures. Directed by Yutaka Yamamoto, the series ran between October 4 and December 27, 2008. Bandai Entertainment licensed the manga for distribution in North America. They released the first three volumes in the series, however further releases were canceled by Bandai Entertainment's restructuring of itself in 2012.

The manga went into hiatus after Eri Takenashi developed a Subarachnoid hemorrhage in early November 2008. The manga resumed with the September 2011 issue of Comic Rex on July 27, 2011, but due to ongoing concerns for her health, Takenashi warned in a June 24, 2011 post on her blog that the series' publishing schedule would be irregular, though her goal was for a bi-monthly release.



Volume list

See also

List of Kannagi: Crazy Shrine Maidens episodes

References

Kannagi: Crazy Shrine Maidens